Industrial Arts Building may refer to:

 Industrial Arts Building (Tempe, Arizona), listed on the NRHP in Maricopa County, Arizona
 Industrial Arts Building (Bowling Green, Kentucky), listed on the NRHP in Warren County, Kentucky
 Industrial Arts Building (Lincoln, Nebraska), listed on America's Most Endangered Places in 2010